The Old Fourth Ward, often abbreviated O4W, is an intown neighborhood on the eastside of Atlanta, Georgia, United States. The neighborhood is best known as the location of the Martin Luther King Jr. historic site.

Geography
The Old Fourth Ward's borders:
 West: Piedmont Avenue, across which is Downtown Atlanta 
 East: the BeltLine, across which are Poncey–Highland and Inman Park 
 North: Ponce de Leon Avenue, across which is Midtown Atlanta
 South: MARTA Green Line and Oakland Cemetery, across which are Grant Park and Cabbagetown

The exception is the area west of Boulevard and south of Freedom Parkway which, although historically part of Atlanta's Fourth Ward (see Atlanta annexations and wards), is considered a separate recognized neighborhood called Sweet Auburn.

The neighborhood can be divided into three areas, with Freedom Parkway and Boulevard serving as dividing lines.

Northeast
The area north of Freedom Parkway and east of Boulevard is one of the city's most up-and-coming areas. It is home to the 2.1 million sq. ft. Ponce City Market, a mixed-use development, and Historic Fourth Ward Park, a product of the BeltLine project. In the 2010s, many new multi-family developments have been built bordering the park, including BOHO4W, AMLI Ponce Park, and 755 North. The BeltLine Eastside Trail is the eastern border of this area.

Northwest
The area west of Boulevard and north of Freedom Parkway was once called Bedford Pine, and, prior to the 1960s, it was a slum called Buttermilk Bottom. In the 1960s, slum housing gave way to massive urban renewal and the construction of large projects, such as the Atlanta Civic Center, the Georgia Power headquarters, and public housing projects. Bedford Pine was officially absorbed into the Old Fourth Ward neighborhood, whose boundaries officially extend west to Piedmont Avenue.

Boulevard
Boulevard itself, in the 1890s described as "one of the most desirable residence streets in the city," has for decades been notorious citywide as a center of crime and drug activity, as well as the highest concentration of Section 8 housing in the Southeastern United States. However, in January 2012, City Councilman Kwanza Hall revealed a seven-point "Year of Boulevard" strategy to revitalize the corridor.

Southeast

The largest concentration of single family homes are found south of Freedom Parkway, especially south of Irwin Street, and the area is perhaps the most eclectic part of O4W. Auburn Avenue and Old Wheat Streets are in character extensions of the historic African-American business and residential district, Sweet Auburn, and of the Martin Luther King Jr. National Historic Site.

The Ward’s primary nightlife district is centered on the intersection of Boulevard and Edgewood Avenue, where there is a concentration of bars and restaurants.

The eastern border is the BeltLine Eastside Trail, lined with repurposed industrial buildings such as Studioplex, now used for residential and retail use.

History

What is now the Old Fourth Ward is a smaller version of the historic Fourth Ward political area in place until the 1950s when the city changed to a district system. It is one of the oldest sections of the city, with the westernmost blocks developing soon after the Civil War. Different parts of the ward were, at different times, considered white, black, or mixed-race areas. From the 1910s onward, as Atlanta politicians moved to institutionalize racially segregated residential areas, Old Fourth Ward continued as a patchwork of whites living as close neighbors with blacks.

The Ward was home to the spectrum of races but also socioeconomic classes: the foremost thoroughfare in today's Old Fourth Ward, Boulevard, was in the 1890s called one of the most desirable residential streets in the city, even as the Buttermilk Bottom slum festered less than half a mile west. However, after the Great Atlanta fire of 1917, Boulevard's grand houses were destroyed and replaced by brick apartment buildings.

As with most of Intown Atlanta, the Old Fourth Ward declined precipitously during the 1950s and 1960s as wealthier residents moved further out from central neighborhoods. Streets, houses and businesses that sat upon the land that is now Freedom Parkway were also razed to make way for a freeway that was never built. What was once a consistent and dense grid pattern of streets is now difficult to recognize, with Freedom Parkway occupying what had once been multiple city blocks.

Boulevard in particular witnessed a steady decline. The road is lined with apartment buildings constructed after the Great Atlanta fire of 1917, most of which are now section 8 housing. Boulevard became infamous throughout Atlanta and beyond as a haven of drug activity, prostitution, and other crime, a reputation that endured into the 2010s, despite gentrification to the north, south, east and west of the street. 

Gentrification of the Old Fourth Ward began in the 1980s, and continued at a more rapid pace during the first decade of the 2000s. New apartment and condo complexes with ground-floor retail sprung up, particularly along the BeltLine, Ponce de Leon Avenue, North Avenue, and Highland Avenue. The area, which remains majority black, has seen a huge influx of whites in recent decades. The trend began in the 1980s, and from 1980 to 2000, the area west of Boulevard went from 12% to 30% white and the area east of Boulevard went from 2% to 20% white.

Demographics
Total 2010 population of the Old Fourth Ward is 10,505.

For census tracts 17 and 29, which cover the area south of North Ave., west of the BeltLine, north of Edgewood Ave., and east of Jackson/Parkway (thus including Boulevard), the racial mix has changed as shown:

Source: 2000 and 2010 Census Redistricting Data (Public Law 94-171) Summary File accessed on US Census Bureau "U.S. Census website" site

Demographic history
Most of what is today the Old Fourth Ward had been a black residential area since the late 19th or early 20th century. The black residential area between downtown Atlanta and  Bedford Place (now Central Park Place) was called Buttermilk Bottom, and to its south was the black business and residential district of Sweet Auburn.
To the east of Sweet Auburn, Boulevard south of what is today the AMC remained a white street through the 1910s. However the side streets became increasingly black, due to black Atlantans moving eastwards, seeking to consolidate their businesses and residences into safe, primarily black areas after the Atlanta race riot of 1906.  On Boulevard itself, Morris Brown College has been founded in 1885 at the intersection of Boulevard and Houston St. (now John Wesley Dobbs Ave.) and in 1922 expanded, acquiring the land at the southeast corner of Boulevard and Irwin St. (The college later moved to its present location at the Atlanta University Center). From then on through the 1940s many of the fine homes on the south end of Boulevard began to be purchased by prominent African-American "doctors, bishops, ministers [and]...attorneys", thus completing the consolidation of what is now the southeastern quarter of the Old Fourth Ward (from the MLK Memorial eastwards) to an overwhelmingly black residential area.

In the 1950s and early 1960s, the City of Atlanta was still highly segregated, and as part of city planning, the City still concerned itself with designating certain neighborhoods for white or black residential use. A City map from that era shows, that in 1951, the black residential area in today's Old Fourth Ward consisted of the area west of Parkway and everything south of (but not including) North Ave., as well as the area east of Parkway south of East Ave. The western border of the "black area" jogged from Piedmont to Courtland, roughly the same as the western border of today's Old Fourth Ward. Thus, the black residential area corresponded to all but the northeastern quarter of today's Old Fourth Ward, but did not include Boulevard north of today's AMC, which remained a "white area" according to the City. There was also a black "island" within the northeastern quarter on the site of today's Historic Fourth Ward Park Retention Pond.

By 1957, the black residential area had expanded eastwards four blocks, into the area bounded by Parkway on the west, North Ave. on the north, Glen Iris Dr. on the east, and East Ave. on the south. Thus, all of Boulevard was now a "black area" according to the City. The "black area" in 1957 also added North Ave. and Kennesaw Ave. along its northern edge. By 1963, four additional blocks along the western edge between Piedmont and Courtland had become a black residential area. At this point, all but a few blocks of today's Old Fourth Ward were black residential areas.

Then in the 1960s, Buttermilk Bottom, was razed to make way for urban redevelopment projects and rechristened "Bedford Pine". However, most of the land remained empty until the mid-1980s when new residential communities were built on the land, with a mix of incomes and races. Thus the western end of today's Old Fourth Ward became racially diverse.

Trails and parks

Two of the city's iconic walking and biking trails intersect in the neighborhood:
 BeltLine Eastside Trail
 Freedom Parkway park and trail

Historic Fourth Ward Park and Skate Park opened in phases starting in 2011 and includes an attractive retention pond. The area around the park has since mushroomed with large apartment buildings.

Other parks include:
 Central Park
 Renaissance Park and Dog Park
 Selena Butler Park

Culture
The Old Fourth Ward is one of Atlanta's best neighborhoods for viewing street art. Some of the best locations to view street art in the Old Fourth Ward include Decatur St., Edgewood Ave. and on and around the Eastside Trail of the Atlanta Beltline.  The Outerspace Project is responsible for bringing many works of street art to the Old Fourth Ward.  Several examples of street art in the Old Fourth Ward are found on the Atlanta Street Art Map.

Other points of interest

Ponce City Market
Edgewood Avenue around Boulevard has become a bar and restaurant district after decades of neglect, prior to 2013 having been known for "drug traffic, petty crime, and homeless hideaways". Sister Louisa's Church of the Living Room and Ping Pong Emporium, a bar, is a landmark here.
Atlanta Medical Center, formerly Georgia Baptist Hospital
 Industrial architecture along the BeltLine Eastside Trail, including the DuPre Excelsior Mill and National NuGrape Company lofts
 part of the Martin Luther King Jr. National Historic Site, including King's Birth Home
Atlanta Civic Center
Edward C. Peters House
Homage to King sculpture
WSB-TV tower
 The Carter Center borders the neighborhood
 Old Fourth Distillery - Atlanta's 1st distillery since prohibition. located on Edgewood Ave.
The Jackson Street Bridge is one of Atlanta's most iconic landmarks for photos

Transportation
The MARTA Green Line runs east-west at the south end of the neighborhood, although there is no station in O4W itself. King Memorial station is to the west and Inman Park / Reynoldstown station is to the east. The Atlanta Streetcar line starts just west of the neighborhood. Several MARTA bus lines serve the neighborhood. Relay provides bike share.

References

External links
 Bedford Pine Neighborhood Photograph Collection, 1970-1971 from the Atlanta History Center

Old Fourth Ward organizations
Fourth Ward West (FWW), until 2012 known as Central Atlanta Neighbors (CAN) - covers north of the Baker-Highland connector (extension of Freedom Parkway), west of Boulevard to Peachtree Street thus including part of Downtown Atlanta)
Fourth Ward Alliance (on Facebook) - covers north of Freedom Parkway, east of Boulevard
Fourth Ward Neighbors - covers south of Freedom Parkway
www.o4wpatrol.org Old 4th Ward Security Patrol

About the Old Fourth Ward
Robbie Brown, "King's Atlanta neighborhood on the upswing", Surfacing in New York Times, December 4, 2011
"Dr. Martin Luther King Jr.'s Atlanta neighborhood on the upswing" (slideshow), New York Times, December 4, 2011

 
Neighborhoods in Atlanta
Hipster neighborhoods